Artur Te (born 21 May 1993) is a Kyrgyzstani judoka. He competed at the World Judo Championships in 2017, 2018 and 2019.

In 2018, he won one of the bronze medals in the men's 66 kg event at the Asian Games held in Jakarta, Indonesia. At the 2019 Asian-Pacific Judo Championships held in Fujairah, United Arab Emirates, he won one of the bronze medals in the men's 66 kg event.

References

External links
 

Living people
1993 births
Place of birth missing (living people)
Kyrgyzstani male judoka
Judoka at the 2018 Asian Games
Asian Games bronze medalists for Kyrgyzstan
Asian Games medalists in judo
Medalists at the 2018 Asian Games
20th-century Kyrgyzstani people
21st-century Kyrgyzstani people